Battle Beneath the Earth is a 1967 British sci-fi thriller film starring Kerwin Mathews. It was released by Metro-Goldwyn-Mayer. The film also features character actor Ed Bishop.

Plot 
Scientist Arnold Kramer believes that rogue elements of the communist Chinese Army headed by fanatic General Chan Lu are using advanced burrowing machines in an effort to conquer the U.S. by placing atomic bombs under major cities. In the opening, Las Vegas police are called for a report that Dr. Kramer is prone in a sidewalk telling people he hears movement underneath.

The bombs are in tunnels dug from China through the Hawaiian islands to the United States. In the expected war 100 million are forecast to die.  He is committed to an asylum, but when he is visited by U.S. Navy commander Jonathan Shaw, what he tells him lines up with observations Shaw made himself. Shaw gets him released and produces enough evidence to convince his superiors that the story is on the level, and he is ordered to lead troops underground to defeat the red army and defuse the bombs.

The movie ends with the U.S. Army detonating nuclear bombs in the tunnel in Hawaii.  The detonations are reported to have stopped all activity in the tunnels.

Cast

Release 
The movie was featured on the CBS Late Movie, in late-December 1973. The picture later received a VHS home-video release in the early 1980s.

It was also a staple of afternoon-movie or Saturday-morning Creature Features-type TV programs before the historic sale of the MGM/UA film library. Metro-Goldwyn-Mayer originally handled North American theatrical distribution.

The movie was released to DVD by Warner Home Video on 29 July 2008, as a Best Buy exclusive double feature with The Ultimate Warrior.

Reception 
The film has been described as "deliriously paranoid".

Score 
The film features a fast-paced "crime-jazz" / jazz-noir musical score by Ken Jones.

See also
 Invasion literature

References

External links 
 
 
 
 

1967 films
1960s action films 
British action films 
British spy films 
Cold War spy films
1960s English-language films
Films about nuclear war and weapons
Films directed by Montgomery Tully
Metro-Goldwyn-Mayer films
Films shot at MGM-British Studios
1960s British films